Trinity Christian School is a private Baptist Christian school in Texarkana, Arkansas, United States.  TCS is a ministry of Trinity Baptist Church and is accredited by the Arkansas Nonpublic School Accrediting Association and is affiliated with the American Association of Christian Schools (AACS).

Extracurricular activities 
The Trinity Christian School mascot and athletic emblem is the Warrior with navy blue and white with orange accent serving as the school colors.

For 2012–14, Trinity Christian High School participates in the 1A Classification from the 1A 7 East Conference as administered by the Arkansas Activities Association. The Warriors compete in cross country (boys/girls), basketball (boys/girls), baseball, softball, and track and field (boys/girls).

 Track and field: The boys track team won four consecutive 1A classification state track and field championships (2009, 2010, 2011, 2012). The girls track team won three consecutive state track titles (2008, 2009, 2010).

References

External links 
 

Baptist schools in the United States
Christian schools in Arkansas
Private elementary schools in Arkansas
Private middle schools in Arkansas
Private high schools in Arkansas
Schools in Miller County, Arkansas
Buildings and structures in Texarkana, Arkansas